Mohammad Hassan Rahimian (born: in 1948, Isfahan) is an Iranian Twelver Shia cleric, who has been appointed as the trusteeship of Jamkaran Mosque since 2013 till now --by the decree of supreme leader of Iran, Seyyed Ali Khamenei. Rahimian is the head of the Central-Council of Popular Front of Islamic Revolution Forces, and the administrative board of the Front of Islamic Revolution Stability.

According to Fars News, Mohammad Hassan Rahimian was born in 1948 in Isfahan, and commenced to educate for Hawzah lessons. Afterwards departed for Qom, and was active among the closest companions of Seyyed Ruhollah Khomeini. Later on, he escaped from SAVAK and immigrated to Iraq and jointed Iran's first supreme-leader.

This Shiite ayatollah who has been among the students of Iran's former/first supreme-leader Seyyed Ruhollah Khomeini, used to study by two other known teachers, namely Seyyed Mohammad Baqer Sadr and Seyyed Abu Al-Qasem Khoei. After Seyyed Ruhollah Khomeini's demise, he was appointed as "Deputy of the Martyr of the Islamic Revolution Foundation" and as the representative of Wali-e-Faqih.

See also 
 Popular Front of Islamic Revolution Forces
 Jamkaran Mosque
 Foundation of Martyrs and Veterans Affairs

References

Living people
Shia clerics from Isfahan
1948 births
Politicians from Isfahan